VARTA AG (– ) is a German company manufacturing batteries for global automotive, industrial, and consumer markets.

History
VARTA was founded by Adolf Müller in 1887, and established in 1904 as a subsidiary of Accumulatoren-Fabrik AFA. After World War I, VARTA together with AFA was acquired by German industrialist Günther Quandt and Industrialist and VARTA CEO Dr. Carl Hermann Roderbourg. After World War II, most of the VARTA shares passed from Günther Quandt to his son, Herbert Quandt. The subsidiary in East Berlin was later occupied by the Soviet Union, and was named BAE Batterien.

In 1977, VARTA AG's businesses were split up by Herbert Quandt; battery and plastics operations were retained in VARTA AG, but the pharmaceuticals and specialty chemical businesses were transferred to a new company called Altana, and the electrical business was spun off into a company called CEAG. Herbert Quandt left the company's shares to his children.

In 2002, the consumer battery activities (excluding button cells) were sold to Rayovac. The automotive battery business was acquired by Johnson Controls. The button cell and home energy storage businesses were acquired by Montana Tech Components.

By 2006, VARTA AG had sold all its operating divisions, and the Quandts had sold their shares. VARTA AG then liquidated its remaining assets, contracts, liabilities and shareholdings, in particular the manufacture and sale of VARTA batteries, while continuing its company businesses.

On 19 October 2017 shares of the VARTA AG started flotation on the stock market (Prime Standard). With an emission price of 17,50 Euro the company had a value of 668,5 Mio. Euro On 2 January 2019, American company Energizer Holdings, Inc. took control over VARTA's consumer battery segment. On 29 May 2019, VARTA AG signed an agreement to acquire the VARTA Consumer Batteries business for the Europe, Middle East and Africa regions (including the manufacturing and distribution facilities in Germany) from Energizer Holdings, which was completed on 2 January 2020.

Products

References

External links

 
 Official website for VARTA Automotive Batteries

Companies listed on the Frankfurt Stock Exchange
Electric power companies of Germany
Manufacturing companies established in 1887
German brands
Consumer battery manufacturers
Motor vehicle battery manufacturers
1887 establishments in Germany
Companies in the TecDAX
Companies in the MDAX
Quandt family